Ramdas a.k.a. Lallu Bhaiya was an Indian politician from the state of the Madhya Pradesh.
He represented Murwara constituency of undivided Madhya Pradesh Legislative Assembly by winning General election of 1957. He was elected from the same seat in the 1962 Madhya Pradesh Legislative Assembly election.

References 

Year of birth missing
Possibly living people
Madhya Pradesh MLAs 1957–1962
People from Katni district
Madhya Pradesh MLAs 1962–1967